Falcão – Meninos do Tráfico (English: Falcon: Drug Trafficking’s Boys) is a Brazilian documentary television film directed by rapper MV Bill and Celso Athayde, and associate produced by Central Única das Favelas, about the life of young favela dwellers who work with drug trafficking.

The documentary was recorded between 1998 and 2006, when the producers visited various poor communities in Brazil. During the recordings the two producers had to face the hostile environment where the boys lived.

The name of the documentary comes from the term "falcão" (falcon) used in the slums to refer to the lookouts who keep watch over the community and inform when the police or a rival group approaches.

The film gained special attention after it was transmitted by Rede Globo, the largest television network in the country, in its popular weekly TV show Fantástico.

References

2006 films
2006 documentary films
Brazilian documentary films
Documentary films about the illegal drug trade
Documentary films about poverty
Favelas
Poverty in Brazil